The Ministry of Tourism, a branch of the Government of India, is the apex body for formulation and administration of the rules, regulations and laws relating to the development and promotion of tourism in India. It facilitates the Indian department of tourism. The head of the ministry is Minister of Tourism (India) held by Shri G. Kishan Reddy. To promote the GDP of the country indirectly and to have friendly relations with them, The Government of India announced officially a Visa on Arrival status/facility for International Visitors to enter/visit India from 43 countries including United States, Australia, Vietnam, Thailand, Vanuatu, Singapore, Israel, Jordan, Kenya, Russian Federation, Brazil, Finland, Germany, Japan, Myanmar on 27 November 2014 and some more countries to follow soon.

India stole the limelight at the World Tourism Mart 2011 in London by winning two global awards - World's Leading Destination and World's Leading Tourist Board, Incredible India.

History 
The potential for tourism in India was first recognized with the setting up of a Tourist Traffic Committee, an ad-hoc body, in 1948, to suggest ways and means to promote tourism in India. Based on its recommendations, a tourist traffic branch was set up the following year, with regional offices in Delhi and Mumbai, and in 1951, in Kolkata and Chennai. A separate department of tourism under the government was first created on 1 March 1958, that was put under the ambit of Ministry of Transport and Communications. It was headed by a Director General in the rank of joint secretary. Simultaneously, Tourism Development Council, an advisory body, was constituted and was chaired by the minister in charge of tourism.

After a fall in the number of tourists entering India in 1961 from the preceding year, the government constituted a committee headed by Lakshmi Kant Jha, then secretary in the Department of Economic Affairs, under the Ministry of Finance, to find and examine the reasons. The committee attributed it to the Chinese aggression in the backdrop of the Sino-Indian War that year. Subsequently, as per the committee's recommendations, visa norms were liberalized, and the India Tourism Development Corporation was established in 1966 as a functional agency of the Department of Tourism. Further, Prime Minister Indira Gandhi convened a conference in October that year, the deliberations of which resulted in the creation of the Ministry of Tourism and Civil Aviation. Karan Singh was appointed the first minister.

Despite his skills as an orator and scholarly knowledge in the Sanskrit language, Singh failed to take tourism on a growing path during the initial years, owing mostly to failure in getting funds for the promotion and infrastructure of tourism. He subsequently persuaded Air India to get their officers involved in promotion of tourism to India. Region-wise targets for arrivals were given and Air India chiefs were given powers to oversee the working of overseas tourist offices of India; 'Operation Europe' for the said region was later extended to other areas. Air India's failure to take this forward owing to losses in revenue "collision" of "egos of tourist officers" led to slump in growth of tourism. Prime minister Rajiv Gandhi later took charge of the ministry before quitting in favour of other ministers who, Pran Nath Seth in Successful Tourism wrote, "felt that the tourism portfolio was a demotion", as Civil Aviation was separated from the ministry. During this time, the Tourism was tied with Commerce Ministry, and later under V. P. Singh's ministry, in 1991 with Agriculture, when it was headed by Chaudhary Devi Lal. It was again tied with Civil Aviation that year, headed by Madhavrao Scindia, before the Deve Gowda government in 1996 attached it with the Ministry of Parliamentary Affairs. Tourism was then combined with culture portfolio when it was headed by Jagmohan. The latter was separated in 2002 and an independent ministry for tourism has been active since.

List of Ministers of Tourism

List of Ministers of State

Department of Tourism (State Ministers)

Campaigns

Incredible India

The Ministry of Tourism's joint secretary Amitabh Kant collaborated with Ogilvy & Mather to create the Incredible India marketing initiative, aiming to promote India's image as a high-end tourist destination.

Incredible India 2.0 was launched on September 27, 2017 by President Ram Nath Kovind, on the occasion of World Tourism Day.

Cleanliness Index
Union Tourism Ministry is planning to introduce "Cleanliness Index" for all cities in India. This index will declare the best performers which will motivate other cities to work on this aspect of their appeal. The methodology has been already formulated and will be implemented in 6 cities on a pilot basis.

Tourism campaign at ITB Berlin 
In 2011, Indian tourism department had launched a major tourism campaign at the ITB Berlin (the world's largest travel trade show) under the guidance of Mr Sanjay Kothari and Mr Anand Kumar and Mr M.N. Javed.

Organisation

Statutory Professional Bodies

National Council For Hotel Management and Catering Technology
Institutes of Hotel Management, Catering Technology and Applied Nutrition
Indian Institute of Tourism and Travel Management

Autonomous Bodies
National Institute of Water Sports

Central Public Sector Undertakings

India Tourism Development Corporation
Hotel Corporation of India

See also
India Tourism Development Corporation
Public sector undertaking
Visa policy of India

Notes

External links

 
Tourism